also known as Youtab (Persian: یوتاب yutâb) is an ancient and modern Persian girl's name meaning bright and unique. The Greek/Latin translation of the name is Iotapa or Jotapa, Iotape or Jotape,.

People
Iotapa (disambiguation)

References